The College Park Historic District (also known as College Park Residential Neighborhood) is a U.S. historic district (designated as such on February 9, 2001) located in Lake Worth Beach, Florida. The district is bounded by Maryland Drive, North Federal Highway, 19th Avenue North, and North Dixie Highway. It contains 90 historic buildings and residences.

References

External links

 Palm Beach County listings at National Register of Historic Places

Buildings and structures in Lake Worth Beach, Florida
Historic districts on the National Register of Historic Places in Florida
National Register of Historic Places in Palm Beach County, Florida